The 2015 Dr McKenna Cup, known for sponsorship reasons as the Bank of Ireland Dr McKenna Cup, was an inter-county and colleges hurling competition in the province of Ulster. As well as the nine county teams, three colleges' teams competed: St Mary's University College, Belfast, Queen's University Belfast and Ulster University. The final was broadcast live on BBC Sport NI.

Format
The teams are drawn into three groups of four teams. Each team plays the other teams in its group once, earning 2 points for a win and 1 for a draw. The three group winners, and the best runner-up progress to the semi-finals.

Results

Final

References

McKenna Cup
Dr McKenna Cup seasons